The men's team table tennis event was part of the table tennis programme and took place between December 17 and 19, at the Wunna Theikdi Indoor Stadium, Naypyidaw, Myanmar.

Schedule
All times are Myanmar Standard Time (UTC+06:30)

Results

Preliminary round

Group A

Group B

Knockout round

Semifinals

Final

References

Table tennis at the 2013 Southeast Asian Games